New Hampshire Route 120 is a  secondary north–south state highway in Sullivan and Grafton counties in the upper Connecticut River Valley region of New Hampshire.  Its southern terminus is at New Hampshire Route 11 and New Hampshire Route 103 in Claremont.  Its northern terminus is at New Hampshire Route 10 in Hanover.

Route description 
NH 120 begins in downtown Claremont on the Sugar River at NH 11 / NH 103.  The initial stretch of the highway is on North Street but then it turns onto Hanover Street and heads north, passing through the towns of Cornish and Plainfield with no major junctions.  NH 120 enters Lebanon and proceeds directly into the heart of the city, where it meets (and briefly overlaps) U.S. Route 4 at a large roundabout. NH 120 turns north again, interchanging with Interstate 89 / NH 10, and continues out of town.  NH 120 then crosses into Hanover and proceeds northwest into the center of town where it terminates at NH 10 near Dartmouth College.

NH 120 is cosigned with NH 10 on North Park Street in Hanover to terminate at Lyme Road/College Street, but this does not appear to be part of the official routing.

Major intersections

References

External links

 New Hampshire State Route 120 on Flickr

120
Transportation in Sullivan County, New Hampshire
Transportation in Grafton County, New Hampshire